Bombylius discolor  is a Palearctic species of fly in the family Bombyliidae.

References

External links
Van Veen

Bombyliidae
Insects described in 1796